The following lists events that happened in 1913 in El Salvador.

Incumbents
President: Manuel Enrique Araujo (until 9 February), Carlos Meléndez Ramírez (starting 9 February)
Vice President: Onofre Durán (until 9 February), Vacant (starting 9 February)

Events

February
 9 February – Manuel Enrique Araujo was attacked with machetes and assassinated. Carlos Meléndez Ramírez became Provisional President.
 11 February – The Roman Catholic Diocese of San Miguel was established with Juan Antonio Dueñas y Argumedo as Ordinary. The Roman Catholic Diocese of Santa Ana was also established.

References

 
El Salvador
1910s in El Salvador
Years of the 20th century in El Salvador
El Salvador